School for Sex is a 1969 British sex comedy film directed, produced and written by Pete Walker.

Cast
 Derek Aylward as Giles Wingate
 Rose Alba as Duchess of Burwash
 Bob Andrews as Sgt. Braithwaite
 Vic Wise as Horace Clapp
 Hugh Latimer as Berridge
 Nosher Powell as Hector
 Amber Dean Smith as Beth Villiers
 Françoise Pascal as Sally Reagan
 Cathy Howard as Sue Randall
 Sylvia Barlow as Judy Arkwright
 Sandra Gleeson as Jenny
 Maria Frost as Polly
 Cindy Neal as Marianne
 Gilly Grant as Striptease Artist
 Jackie Berdet as Ingeborg
 Nicole Austen as Tania
 Edgar K. Bruce as Fred
 Robert Dorning as Civil Sergeant
 Julie May as Ethel
 Alec Bregonzi as Harry
 Wilfred Babbage as Judge
 Dennis Castle as Colonel Roberts

Production

Filming locations
The film was shot on location in Kent, Sussex and London, England.

Music
The music was composed and conducted by Harry South.

Reception

Box office
The film was very popular at the box office. In France it enjoyed 72,000 admissions in its opening week.

References

External links

1968 films
British independent films
1960s exploitation films
Films directed by Pete Walker
British sex comedy films
British sexploitation films
1960s sex comedy films
1968 comedy films
1969 independent films
1960s English-language films
1960s British films